Carone is a surname. It may refer to the following notable people:

 Jim Carone (born 1981), American college baseball coach
 Juan Carlos Carone (born 1942), Argentine footballer
 Mauricio Claver-Carone, American political advocate
 Nicolas Carone (1917–2010), American artist
 Patricia Carone (born 1943), American politician
 Pierdavide Carone (born 1988), Italian singer-songwriter
 Walter Carone (1920–1982), Italian-French photographer

pt:Carone